Maria Kornevik-Jakobsson, born in 1953, is a Swedish politician of the Centre Party. She became a substitute member of the Riksdag in 2006. In 2007  Kornevik-Jakobsson replaced Åsa Torstensson who is on leave.

External links 
Maria Kornevik-Jakobsson at the Riksdag website

Members of the Riksdag from the Centre Party (Sweden)
Living people
1953 births
Women members of the Riksdag
21st-century Swedish women politicians
Members of the Riksdag 2006–2010